Argyresthia tsuga is a moth of the family Yponomeutidae. It is found in North America, including British Columbia.

The larvae feed on Tsuga heterophylla.

References

Moths described in 1972
Argyresthia
Moths of North America